Sergei Dmitrievich Stolyarov (– 9 December 1969) was a film and theater actor. The winner of the Stalin Prize of the first degree (1951). People's Artist of the RSFSR (1969). Member of the Communist Party of the Soviet Union since 1958.

Selected filmography
 1935 — Aerograd as Vladimir Glushak 
1936 — Circus as Ivan Petrovich Martynov
 1944 — Kashchey the Deathless as Nikita Kozhemyaka
 1951 — Far from Moscow as Alexander Ivanovich Rogov
 1952  —  Sadko as Sadko
 1956 — Ilya Muromets as Alyosha Popovich
 1959 — A Man Changes Skin as  Vladimir Ivanovich Sinitsyn
 1967 — The Andromeda Nebula as Dar Veter

Notes

References

External links

 
 
 
  Sergei Stolyarov's Filmography  on KinoPoisk

1911 births
1969 deaths
People from Serebryano-Prudsky District
People from Venyovsky Uyezd
Communist Party of the Soviet Union members
20th-century Russian male actors
Soviet male actors
Socialist realism
People's Artists of the RSFSR
Stalin Prize winners
Recipients of the Order of the Red Banner of Labour
Deaths from cancer in the Soviet Union
Burials at Vagankovo Cemetery